Ambarchik Bay is a shallow bay in  the eastern Kolyma Gulf in the East Siberian Sea. The port and polar station of Ambarchik (a transit station during the Gulag), is located on the coastline of the bay.

Climate

References 

Bodies of water of the Sakha Republic
Bays of Russia
Bays of the East Siberian Sea